Lorenza Arnetoli (born 30 March 1974) is an Italian basketball player. She competed in the women's tournament at the 1996 Summer Olympics.

References

1974 births
Living people
Italian women's basketball players
Olympic basketball players of Italy
Basketball players at the 1996 Summer Olympics
Sportspeople from Florence
20th-century Italian women